Kantemirovskiy Bridge is a large modern (built in 1979 - early 1980s) drawbridge (bascule bridge) in Saint Petersburg, Russia across the Bolshaya Nevka arm of the Neva river. The bridge connects the northern Aptekarsky Island (Apothecary Island) of the north-central Petrogradsky District on Petrograd Side with northeastern Vyborgskiy District of the city and over it with the northeast and east of Saint Petersburg.
It receives automobile traffic from Bolshoy Prospekt (Petrograd Side) via Prospekt Medikov in the southwest and takes it to Kantemirovskaya Street on the right-hand riverside, after which it was named. 
The street itself was named in 1952 after the railway station of a settlement of Kantemirovka in Voronezh region which was liberated from Nazi Germany troops by the Soviet Red Army in December 1942, which was a military achievement. The settlement in its turn was named after its 18 century owner Dimitrie Cantemir and his brother Constantin, Moldavian princes given shelter in Russia after a military defeat and entered into Russian nobility.

History
It was built in 1979-82 as a part of a citywide thoroughfare street chain project at a place without a previous bridge:

There used to be a boat connection in its place since early 19 century.

Neighborhood objects of interest

Petrograd Side
 Saint Petersburg TV Tower, the tallest structure of the city from the 1960s until the completion of the Gazprom office skyscraper Lakhta Center.

 Pyotr Stolypin assassination attempt obelisk on the site of his country house
 Saint Petersburg Botanical Garden

St Petersburg Museum of Avant-garde (Matyushin's House) (see Avant-garde, Mikhail Matyushin), a branch of State Museum of the History of St. Petersburg (Rus.Музей петербургского авангарда).
Saint Petersburg Electrotechnical University with physicist  co-inventor of the radio  Professor Alexander Popov's Museum Apartment and Laboratory in the street named after him. 

 Museum of the History of Photography (MHP) (Rus. Музей истории фотографии).

Vyborg Side

 Higher School of Economics Saint Petersburg campus red brick building converted from a textile mill (Rus. pre-1917 Никольская мануфактура; Voronin, Lutz and Chesher Co. weaving building; in the Soviet times nationalised as "Красный маяк" (Krasniy mayak "Red Lighthouse").
 In front of it a modern sculpture of a red sitting human created by a local artist and designer, enthusiast of street art Andrey Lublinskiy on his contract from Higher School of Economics, at whose another Saint Petersburg address he also teaches, with more of his sculptures placed at both locations. Such sculptures of his have been copied and / or installed elsewhere from Samara city on Volga and Perm city in the Urals to China, sometimes without the author's knowledge.

See also 
 List of bridges in Saint Petersburg

Reading

References

Bridges in Saint Petersburg